Sekou Ouattara (born 19 March 1986) is an Ivorian football player who currently plays for Le Mans Union Club 72 in France.

References
Guardian Football

1986 births
Living people
Ivorian footballers
K.S.K. Beveren players
Footballers from Abidjan
Association football defenders